The 2016 Tippeligaen was the 72nd completed season of top-tier football in Norway. The competition began on 11 March 2016. Due to the 2016 UEFA European Championship, there was a break between the rounds played on 29 May and 3 July. The decisive matches of the home-and-away season were played on 6 November 2016. A promotion/relegation play-off between the third-from-bottom team of the Tippeligaen and the winner of the promotion play-offs of the 2016 1. divisjon was contested on 30 November and 4 December 2016.

The league was contested by 16 teams: the 13 best teams of the 2015 season; the two teams who won direct promotion from the 2015 1. divisjon, Sogndal and Brann; and Start, who won the promotion/relegation play-off finals against Jerv.

The 2016 season was the last season the league was named Tippeligaen. The league changed its name to Eliteserien ahead of the 2017 season, a non-sponsor affiliated name controlled by the Football Association of Norway.

Teams
Sixteen teams competed in the league – the top fourteen teams from the previous season, and two teams promoted from 1. divisjon.

Stadia and locations

Note: Table lists in alphabetical order.

Personnel and kits

Managerial changes

League table

Positions by round

Results

Relegation play-offs

The 14th-placed team, Stabæk, took part in a two-legged play-off against Jerv, the winners of the 2016 1. divisjon promotion play-offs, to decide who would play in the 2017 Eliteserien.

Stabæk won 2–1 on aggregate and retained their place in the 2017 Eliteserien; Jerv remained in the 1. divisjon.

Season statistics

Top scorers

Hat-tricks

Notes
(H) – Home team(A) – Away team

Top assists

Discipline

Player

Most yellow cards: 10
 Kjetil Wæhler (Vålerenga)
Most red cards: 2
 Francisco Júnior (Strømsgodset)
 Frode Kippe (Lillestrøm)

Club
Most yellow cards: 56  
Brann

Most red cards: 4
Strømsgodset

Attendances

Awards

Annual awards

References

Eliteserien seasons
1
Norway
Norway